Chalissery is a village and gram panchayat in the Pattambi taluk, Palakkad district, state of Kerala, India.

References

Gram panchayats in Palakkad district
Villages in Palakkad district